Daniel Ost (born 5 August 1955) is a Belgian floral artist, floral designer and garden architect. CBS News has described him as "the world's leading flower designer" while The New York Times says that "to call him a master flower designer is akin to calling Annie Leibovitz a shutterbug".

His clientele includes numerous royal families, sheikhs, multinational organisations and humanitarian organisations like UNICEF.

Biography
Ost was born in 1955 in the suburban town of Sint-Niklaas, Belgium, in a family of which he was the eldest of six children.

Marriage and children
Ost and his wife Marie-Anne have two children. Maarten Ost is a children's book author and lives in Leuven, Belgium, and his daughter, Nele Ost, is following in his footsteps as a floral designer and is currently in charge of the retail operations.

Education
Sociology at Bisschoppelijke Normaalschool in Sint-Niklaas, Belgium, from 1967 to 1973
Flower design at IMOV Institute in Afsnee, Belgium, from 1973 to 1976
Master of Floral Art at Tuinbouwschool Vught, The Netherlands, from 1976 to 1979
Instructor floral art in Japan and Taiwan
Founder of Daniël Ost Flower Academy in Sint-Niklaas and Tokyo, Japan

Published works
Throughout his career, Ost has published numerous books about his exhibitions, decorations and gardens. He has also been featured in numerous magazines like Elle, Vogue, Architectural Digest and Bloomberg, regarding floral design and garden architecture.

Leafing Through Flowers I (1989)
Leafing Through Flowers II (1993)
Leafing Through Flowers III (1997)
Ostentatief (1998)
Invitations (2002)
Remaining Flowers (2003)
East x West (2005)
Transparant (2007)
Invitations II (2009)
Daniël Ost - The Master (2015)

Awards
1st place Belgian Championship in Brussels in 1979
1st place Belgian Championship in Brussels in 1983
1st place Golden Orchid in Hannover  in 1981
1st place Golden Orchid in Hannover in 1983
2nd place European Championship in Brussels in 1983
2nd place World Championship in Detroit in 1985
1st place Osaka World Expo in Osaka  in 1990
Citizen of Honour of Sint-Niklaas since 2005
Top 7 European Garden Designers in Germany in 2014

Honours 
 2015: Imperial Order of the Rising Sun.
 Citizen of Honour of Kurashiki (Japan) since 2015

References

External links 
 Official web site
 Japanese gallery of Ost art

Belgian artists
Florists
1955 births
Living people
People from Sint-Niklaas
Recipients of the Order of the Rising Sun, 4th class